Patrick James Meares (born September 6, 1968) is a former Major League Baseball shortstop.

Meares was the 12th round draft pick of the 1990 amateur draft by the Minnesota Twins, from Wichita State University.

Meares made his major league debut on May 5, 1993 with the Minnesota Twins. He played six full seasons with the Minnesota Twins, with a high of 152 games in 1996. He was granted free agency after the 1998 season, and he then signed with the Pittsburgh Pirates before the 1999 season. He played two full seasons and one incomplete season (1999 with 21 games) with the Pittsburgh Pirates with a career high of a .308 batting average in 1999. Meares played 742 games with the Minnesota Twins and 239 games with the Pittsburgh Pirates, with a total of 981 professional baseball games in his career. His last major league game took place on October 7, 2001 vs. Chicago Cubs. 

He led the American League in errors by a shortstop with 18 in 1995.

External links

1968 births
Living people
Minnesota Twins players
Pittsburgh Pirates players
Major League Baseball shortstops
Baseball players from Kansas
Nashville Sounds players
Sportspeople from Salina, Kansas
Wichita State Shockers baseball players
Kenosha Twins players
Orlando Sun Rays players
Portland Beavers players
Visalia Oaks players
Alaska Goldpanners of Fairbanks players